Maartje is a Dutch feminine given name, a diminutive of the names Martina and Marthinus. People with the name include:

 Maartje Boudeling (born 1939), Dutch chef
 Maartje Goderie (born 1984), Dutch field hockey player
 Maartje Köster (born 1975), Dutch cricketer
 Maartje Nevejan, Dutch filmmaker
 Maartje Offers (1891–1944), Dutch classical singer
 Maartje Paumen (born 1985), Dutch field hockey player
 Maartje Scheepstra (born 1980), Dutch field hockey player
 Maartje van Putten (born 1951), Dutch politician
 Maartje Verhoef (born 1997), Dutch fashion model

See also 
 1353 Maartje, main-belt asteroid

Dutch feminine given names